China Suntien Green Energy Corp. Ltd. is a major natural gas and wind power corporation in China. Its headquarters are in Shijiazhuang in the province of Hebei.

Corporate structure
China Suntien Green Energy is a joint stock company established on 9 February 2010 by HECIC (Hebei Construction & Investment Group) and its subsidiary, HECIC Water Investment Co. HECIC is owned by the provincial government of Hebei Province. China Suntien Green Energy is the clean energy arm of HECIC. The initial public offering was one of several Chinese renewable energy IPOs in 2010 and 2011, which included China Goldwind, Datang Renewables (a subsidiary of China Datang Corporation), Shanghai Taisheng Wind Power, and Trony Solar.

China Suntien Green Energy raised US$369 million in its initial public offering on the Hong Kong Stock Exchange. A major foreign investor was JPMorgan Chase, which purchased 13.87 percent of the company's stock within 12 days of its initial trading day.

China Suntien Green Energy engages in the acquisition, sale, and distribution of natural gas; constructs natural gas pipelines; sells natural gas appliances to gas companies and industrial clients; constructs and operates solar and wind power farms; and sells the electricity it generates to electrical utilities. At the time of its incorporation, China Suntien Green Energy owned a single wind farm.

In December 2021, China Suntien Green Energy signed an agreement to purchase one million metric tons of liquified natural gas a year from Qatar Liquefied Gas. The contract runs for 15 years.

References

External links

 Official Website

Natural gas companies of China
Government-owned companies of China
National oil and gas companies
Energy companies established in 2010
Non-renewable resource companies established in 2010
2010 establishments in China
Companies based in Shijiazhuang